Riding West is a 1944 American Western film directed by William Berke and starring Charles Starrett.

Plot
Steve Jordan (Charles Starrett) is hired by Alexander Morton (Steve Clark) as the head man to get the stations, horses and people in order to provide a mail service from California is Missouri.

Cast
 Charles Starrett as Steve Jordan
 Shirley Patterson as Alice Morton
 Arthur Hunnicutt as Prof. Arkansas Higgins (as Arthur 'Arkansas' Hunnicutt)
 Ernest Tubb as Ernie
 Steve Clark as Alexander Morton
 Wheeler Oakman as Captain Amos Karnes
 Blackie Whiteford as Sgt Dobbs (as J.P. Whiteford)
 Clancy Cooper as Blackburn 
 William Wilkerson as Chief Red Eagle (as Bill Wilkerson)
 Ernest Tubb's Singing Cowboys as Riders / Band Member

See also
 List of American films of 1944

External links
 
 

1944 films
1944 Western (genre) films
American Western (genre) films
Films directed by William A. Berke
1940s American films